Together Again is a studio album by The Dubliners. Produced by Pete St. John and featuring four of his compositions, this album, released on the Chyme label in 1979, saw Ronnie Drew return to The Dubliners following Jim McCann's departure. This was the last studio album by The Dubliners to feature Luke Kelly.

Track listing
All tracks Traditional, arranged by The Dubliners; except where indicated

Side One
 "The Mero" (Pete St. John)
 "The Rare Ould Times" (Pete St. John)
 "Spey in Spate/The Steam Packet"
 "Danny Farrell" (Pete St. John)
 "Song of the Iron Road" (Ewan McColl)
 "The Old Man" (Ian Campbell)

Side Two
 "Johnny McGory" (Pete St. John)
 "The Lag Song" (Ewan McColl)
 "Sheahan's M1 Gig" (John Sheahan)
 "And the Band Played Waltzing Matilda" (Eric Bogle)
 "Toss the Feathers/Maid Behind the Bar"
 "The Parting Glass"

References

The Dubliners albums
1979 albums
Polydor Records albums